The  is a denomination of the Japanese yen. In addition to being used as circulating currency, this denomination has also been used to make commemorative coins struck by the Japan Mint. These coins are intended for collectors only and were never issued for circulation.

Composition

Commemorative coins 
Throughout the coin's history, the Japan Mint has issued 500 yen coins commemorating the various subjects of Japan's history. Early commemorative coins minted under the Shōwa era have their dates of reign written in Kanji script. This practice was later replaced by adding Arabic numerals to reflect the current Emperor's year of reign.

1985–1999 (Cupronickel)

2002–2009 (Nickel-brass)

2008–2016 
60th Anniversary of Enforcement of the Local Autonomy Law

Starting in 2008, a program similar to the American 50 State Quarters was put into place which honors all 47 of Japan's prefectures. This was done by celebrating the 60th Anniversary of Enforcement of the Local Autonomy Law in the form of 47 different commemorative coins (designs on obverse side). This program ran until 2016, concluding with the final issues for Tokyo and Fukushima.

2017–present

Notes

References

External links
Commemorative coins issued - Japan Mint website (In English)

Japanese yen coins
Commemorative coins of Japan
Five-hundred-base-unit coins